The Shijiazhuang–Jinan passenger railway, abbreviated Shiji passenger railway is a high-speed railway operated by China Railway High-speed, running between Shijiazhuang and Jinan, the provincial capitals of Hebei and Shandong, respectively. The line will additionally pass through and serve cities of Hengshui, Cangzhou and Dezhou. Traditionally, passengers travelling east from Shijiazhuang towards Shandong would need to detour towards Beijing or Tianjin.

History
In late January 2013, it was announced that construction work on the Shijiazhuang–Jinan passenger railway would begin. The line started operation on December 28, 2017, though it terminated at Jinan West as Jinan East was yet to be completed. Jinan East was opened on 26 December 2018.

Stations

References

High-speed railway lines in China
Standard gauge railways in China
2
Railway lines opened in 2017